is a 1968 Japanese tokusatsu horror film directed by Hiroshi Matsuno. The film's plot begins in the past where a gang of pirates commandeer a ship and kill everyone on board. Three years later in a seaside village, a Catholic priest (Masumi Okada) has offered shelter to Saeko (Kikko Matsuoka) as her twin sister, Yoriko (also Matsuoka) has disappeared with her new husband at sea. Saeko later scuba dives with her boyfriend, the couple find a group of submerged human skeletons, chained together at the ankles near the ocean floor. That night, a ghost ship appears in the mist offshore as a voice from the ship calls out for Saeko.

Production
Director Hiroshi Matsuno began working at the film production company Shochiku in 1950 and worked as an assistant director for filmmakers such as  Daisuke Itō, Mikio Naruse, and Yoshitarō Nomura. Matsuno directed a few films starring Bunta Sugawara in the early sixties before working on The Living Skeleton.
The Living Skeleton was co-written by Kikuma Shimoiizaka, a prolific mystery novelist in Japan.

Release
The Living Skeleton was released on November 9, 1968 in Japan.   It was released as a double feature with Genocide.

It was released on DVD by the Criterion Collection in a box set on November 20, 2012. The other films in the box set included The X from Outer Space, Goké, Body Snatcher from Hell, and Genocide.

Reception
Slant Magazine referred to The Living Skeleton as "representing the peak of Shochiku's dalliance with horror convention" and a "chilling and genuinely unnerving black-and-white update of the bygone kaidan tradition". The Austin Chronicle referred to the film as "probably the most conventional of Schochiku's horror releases"

Professor Wheeler Winston Dixon of the University of Nebraska–Lincoln referred to the Criterion Collection's Eclipse set, calling the film "the most accomplished and sophisticated of the quartet in terms of its visual structure and narrative" and along with Genocide, "easily the most interesting entries".

See also
 List of horror films of 1968
 List of Japanese films of 1968

References

Footnotes

Sources

External links
 
 

1968 films
1968 horror films
Japanese black-and-white films
Japanese horror films
Shochiku films
1960s Japanese films